"I'm Gonna Get You" is a song written by Dennis Linde. It was first recorded by Billy Swan, whose version was released as a single in 1987 and went to number 63 on the U.S. country singles charts. It became a hit the following year for Eddy Raven. It was released in January 1988 as the first single from his compilation album The Best of Eddy Raven The song was Raven's third number one on the country chart.  The single went to number one for one week and spent a total of fourteen weeks in the Top 40.

Chart performance

Billy Swan

Eddy Raven

Year-end charts

Covers
Irish singer Derek Ryan covered the song on his 2012 album Dreamers and Believers.

References

1987 singles
1988 singles
1987 songs
Eddy Raven songs
Billy Swan songs
Songs written by Dennis Linde
Song recordings produced by Barry Beckett
RCA Records singles